The Western Institute of Technology is the name given to a number of Institutes of technology or places of Higher education around the world.

These include:
 Western Institute of Technology (Philippines)
 Western Institute of Technology and Higher Education, Mexico
 Western Institute of Technology at Taranaki, New Zealand
 Western Australian Institute of Technology

See also
Eastern Institute of Technology
National Institutes of Technology
Western University (disambiguation)